Stanislav Kravchuk (born September 25, 1978 in Chirchiq) is an Uzbek-born Ukrainian freestyle skier, specializing in  aerials.

Career
Kravchuk competed at the 1998, 2002, 2006 and 2010 Winter Olympics for Ukraine. In 1998, he qualified for the aerials final, ending up 9th. In 2002, he again qualified for the final, finishing 5th. In 2006, he placed 13th in the qualifying round, failing to advance to the final. In 2010, he placed 19th in the qualifying round of the aerials event, again failing to advance to the final.

As of March 2013, his best showing at the World Championships is 5th, in 2003.

Kravchuk made his World Cup debut in March 1997. As of March 2013, he has won two World Cup events and finished on the podium twelve times. His two wins came in 2007/08 in Deer Valley and 2011/12 in Minsk. His best World Cup overall finish in aerials is 4th, in 2007/08.

World Cup Podiums

References

1978 births
Living people
Olympic freestyle skiers of Ukraine
Freestyle skiers at the 1998 Winter Olympics
Freestyle skiers at the 2002 Winter Olympics
Freestyle skiers at the 2006 Winter Olympics
Freestyle skiers at the 2010 Winter Olympics
People from Chirchiq
Ukrainian male freestyle skiers